Agrupación Deportiva Llerenense is a football team based in Llerena, in the autonomous community of Extremadura. Founded in 1967, it plays in Tercera División RFEF – Group 14, holding home matches at the Estadio Fernando Robina, with a capacity of 1,000 people.

Season to season

12 seasons in Tercera División
1 season in Tercera División RFEF

References

External links
Soccerway team profile

Football clubs in Extremadura
Association football clubs established in 1967
1967 establishments in Spain